The Playoffs to the 1. divisjon in Norwegian association football took place from 1996 up to and including the 2000 season.

The playoffs were instituted because of the streamlining of the 1. divisjon ahead of the 1997 season. It was reduced from two groups to one, and thus, not all winners of the 2. divisjon groups could be promoted.

From the 2001 season, the 2. divisjon got four groups instead of eight, meaning that each of the four group winners was promoted.

2000
Mandalskameratene beat Lofoten 5–2 on aggregate
Ørn-Horten beat FF Lillehammer on the away goals rule; 3–3 on aggregate
Hødd beat Stålkameratene 7–2 on aggregate
Aalesund beat Skjetten 2–1 on aggregate
Reference: RSSSF

1999
Strindheim beat Asker 3–2 on aggregate
Sandefjord beat Fyllingen on the away goals rule; 4–4 on aggregate
Hamarkameratene beat Vidar 4–3 on aggregate
Tromsdalen beat Aalesund after extra time; 5–4 on aggregate
Reference: RSSSF

1998
Liv/Fossekallen beat Fyllingen 6–2 on aggregate
Skjetten beat Ørn-Horten 5–4 on aggregate
Clausenengen beat Mo 6–2 on aggregate
Lofoten beat Vidar 4–3 on aggregate
Reference:

1997
Kjelsås beat Vidar on the away goals rule; 3–3 on aggregate
Raufoss beat Kolstad 5–3 on aggregate
Strindheim beat Fana 4–3 on aggregate
Ullern beat Lofoten 4–2 on aggregate
Reference:

1996
The two number-six-teams from the two groups in the First Division, Byåsen and Harstad, were up for playoff.
Byåsen beat Vigør 8–1 on aggregate
Harstad beat Verdal 4–1 on aggregate
Runar beat Skjetten 6–4 on aggregate
Sarpsborg beat Finnsnes 3–2 on aggregate
Reference: RSSSF

References

Norwegian Second Division
1996 establishments in Norway
2001 disestablishments in Norway
Norwegian First Division